The Mäjilis (Мәжіліс, also transliterated as Mazhilis; "Assembly" in Kazakh) is the lower house of the bicameral Parliament of Kazakhstan, known as the Parlamentı. The upper house of Parliament is the Senate of Kazakhstan. There are 107 seats (98+9). Members of Parliament are elected to five-year terms.

History
After the 1995 Kazakh constitutional referendum was held on 30 August 1995 where Kazakhstani voters overwhelmingly approved a new draft of the Constitution of Kazakhstan, a bicameral Parliament was established that included the lower house Mäjilis.

In the 1995 elections, under the new parliamentary structure, all seats in both houses of parliament were contested in December 1995; runoff elections filled twenty-three seats in the Mäjilis for which the initial vote was inconclusive. International observers reported procedural violations in the Mäjilis voting. The new parliament, which was seated on 30 January 1996, included 68 Kazakh and 31 Russian members; 10 deputies members of which were women.

In the aftermath of the 2004 elections, the Otan became the first party in the Mäjilis to hold the majority of seats which became bigger after the Asar, Civic Party, and Agrarian Party merged with Otan in 2006.

After the constitutional amendments in May 2007, the seats in the Mäjilis were expanded from 77 to 107, which 98 of them were elected through party-list proportional representation that was used for the first time in the 2007 legislative elections. From there, Nur Otan won all the contested seats, eliminating any opposition in the Mazhilis.

In the 2012 legislative elections, minor parties which were the Ak Zhol Democratic Party and Communist People's Party of Kazakhstan entered into Mäjilis however Nur Otan maintains its dominant-party control since then.

Composition
The Mäjilis is composed of 107 members of which 9 of the seats are reserved to the Assembly of People of Kazakhstan. Elections of Mäjilis members are held every 5 years unless a snap election is called earlier and are elected through party-list proportional representation with a required 5% electoral threshold to win seats.

Leadership 

The Chair of the Mazhilis heads the lower house and is elected by the Mäjilis members. The Mäjilis Chair opens sessions, convenes regular joint sessions and chairs the regular and extraordinary joint sessions of the Parliament.

The Mäjilis Chair is assisted by two Deputy Chairs who nominates them and are elected by the members of the Mäjilis. The Deputy Chairs of the Mäjilis carry out tasks made by the Chair who take on certain responsibilities if he or she isn't able to.

Members 
The term of office of the Mäjilis members is five years. Regular elections for Mäajilis are held no later than two months before the end of the term of office of the current convocation of the Parliament. Snap elections of Mäjilis members are held within two months from the date of the early termination of the powers of the Mäajilis.

A member of the Mäjilis can be a person who has reached 25 years of age, is a citizen of Kazakhstan and has permanently resided in its territory for the last ten years.

Deprivation of a deputy of the Mäjilis of the Parliament of the mandate may be made when:

 Withdrawal or expulsion of a deputy from a political party from which, in accordance with the constitutional law, he was elected
 Termination of the activity of a political party, from which, in accordance with the constitutional law, the deputy was elected

Committees 
The Mäjilis is composed of seven committees:

 Committee on Agrarian Issues
 Committee on Legislation and Judicial and Legal Reform 
 Committee on Foreign Affairs, Defense and Security 
 Committee on Social and Cultural Development 
 Committee on Finance and Budget 
 Committee on Issues of Ecology and Environmental Management 
 Committee for Economic Reform and Regional Development

Powers 
According to the Constitution of Kazakhstan, the exclusive jurisdiction of the Mazhilis includes:

 Acceptance for consideration of draft constitutional laws submitted to the Parliament and consideration of these drafts;
 By a majority vote of the total number of deputies of the chamber, giving consent to the President for the appointment of the Prime Minister
 Announcement of the next presidential elections
 Exercise of other powers assigned by the Constitution
 The Mazhilis, by a majority of votes from the total number of Mazhilis members, on the initiative of at least one fifth of the total number of the members, has the right to express a vote of no confidence in the Government

List of Convocations

Latest election
Results of the 2021 Kazakh legislative election

References

External links
Parliament website 
Structure of Kazakhstan's government

Government of Kazakhstan
Kazakhstan
1996 establishments in Kazakhstan